Since 1870, there have been several formal attempts to restrict the copper output and raise, in this form, its price.

This is a list of copper cartels in the 20th century:
 Copper Export Association, CEA, 1918–1923
 Copper Exporters, Inc., CEI, 1926–1932
 International Copper Cartel, ICC, 1935–1939 (created by the World Copper Agreement)
 Intergovernmental Council of Copper Exporting Countries, CIPEC, 1967–1988

Further reading 

 Herfindahl, O. (1959) Copper costs and prices: 1870–1957, RFF, Baltimore.

Copper cartels
Copper mining